Valentin Feodorov Goranko (born 22 September 1959 in Sofia, Bulgaria)  is a Bulgarian-Swedish logician, Professor of Logic and Theoretical Philosophy at the Department of Philosophy, Stockholm University.

Education and academic career 

Goranko studied mathematics (M.Sc. 1984) and obtained Ph.D. in Mathematical Logic at the Faculty of Mathematics and Informatics of the Sofia University "St. Kliment Ohridski" in 1988. Before joining Stockholm University in 2014, he has had several academic positions at universities in Bulgaria (until 1992), South Africa (1992-2009), Denmark (2009-2014) and Sweden (since 2014) and has taught a wide variety of courses in Mathematics, Computer Science, and Logic.

Research fields 

Goranko has a broad range of research interests in the theory and applications of Logic to artificial intelligence, multi-agent systems, philosophy, computer science, and game theory, where he has published 3 books and over 120 research papers and chapters in handbooks and other research collections.

Professional service 

 President (since 2018) of the Scandinavian Logic Society
 Senior member and past president (2016-2020) of the management board of the Association for Logic, Language and Information (FoLLI)
 Editor-in-chief (Logic) of the FoLLI Publications series on Logic, Language and Information, a sub-series of Springer LNCS.
 Executive member of the Board of the European Association for Computer Science Logic EACSL
 Associate Editor of the ACM Transactions on Computational Logic and member of the editorial boards of several other scientific journals.

Published books 

 2015 Logic and Discrete Mathematics: A Concise Introduction
 2016 Temporal Logics in Computer Science
 2016 Logic as a Tool: A Guide to Formal Logical Reasoning

References 

1959 births
Bulgarian logicians
Logicians
Mathematical logicians
Living people